Colac railway station is located on the Warrnambool line in Victoria, Australia. It serves the town of Colac, and it opened on 27 July 1877.

History

Colac opened as the terminus of the line from Birregurra. On 2 July 1883, the line was extended to Camperdown.

Goods facilities included a brick goods shed and a steel shelter, provided with the Freightgate centre during the 1980s. During 1988, a number of sidings were removed, including the oil siding at the Up end, and No. 6 road. In 2008, the points for the crossing loop were removed.

In December 2010, a siding was provided for the stabling of track maintenance machines.

Colac was the interchange with the  gauge Crowes line. This line was built in the early 1900s, to service the farming and timber harvesting areas in the Otway Ranges. The line was built in two stages, with the first to Beech Forest opening on 1 March 1902, and the second to Crowes, on 20 June 1911. The line was closed in sections; Ferguson to Crowes on 9 December 1954, followed by a reopening to Weeaproinah on 19 January 1955, and full closure on 30 June 1962.

Platforms and services

Colac has one platform. It is serviced by V/Line Warrnambool line services.

Platform 1:
 services to Warrnambool and Southern Cross

Transport links

Christian's Bus Company operates three routes via Colac station, under contract to Public Transport Victoria:
: Colac – Elliminyt
: Colac – Colac West
: Colac – Colac East

References

External links
Victorian Railway Stations gallery

Railway stations in Australia opened in 1877
Regional railway stations in Victoria (Australia)
Colac, Victoria